Desmia vulcanalis is a moth in the family Crambidae. It was described by Cajetan Felder, Rudolf Felder and Alois Friedrich Rogenhofer in 1875. It is found in Panama.

References

Moths described in 1875
Desmia
Moths of Central America